Mitchell Thomas Rozanski (born August 6, 1958) is an American prelate of the Roman Catholic Church who has been serving as the archbishop of the Archdiocese of St. Louis in Missouri since 2020.  He previously served as bishop of the Diocese of Springfield in Massachusetts from 2014 to 2020 and as an auxiliary bishop of the Archdiocese of Baltimore in Maryland from 2004 to 2014.

Biography

Early life and education
Mitchell Rozanski was born on August 6, 1958, in Baltimore, Maryland. He attended Sacred Heart of Mary School in Dundalk, Maryland and Our Lady of Mt. Carmel High School in Essex, Maryland.  After his high school graduation,  Rozanski entered the Catholic University of America in Washington, D.C.  He later received his seminary training at the Theological College at Catholic University.

Ordination and ministry
Rozanski was ordained to the priesthood for the Archdiocese of Baltimore by Archbishop William Borders on November 24, 1984.  After his ordination, Rozanksi performed pastoral assignments at the following parishes in Maryland:

 Assistant pastor at St. Michael in Overlea in 1984
 Assistant pastor at the Cathedral of Mary Our Queen in Baltimore in 1985. 
 Associate Pastor at St. Anthony in Baltimore in 1985
 Associate pastor at St. Isaac Jogues in Baltimore in 1990 
 Administrator of Holy Cross and St. Mary Star of the Sea in Baltimore in March 1993, before being appointed pastor there in October 1993 
 Temporary administrator of Immaculate Conception in Towson in January 2000 
 Temporary administrator of St. John the Evangelist in Severna Park, becoming  pastor on November 28, 2000

Auxiliary Bishop of Baltimore

On July 3, 2004, Rozanski was appointed as an auxiliary bishop of the Archdiocese of Baltimore and titular bishop of Walla Walla by Pope John Paul II. He received his episcopal consecration on August 24, 2004, from Cardinal William Keeler, with Bishops William Newman and W. Francis Malooly serving as co-consecrators. Rozanski selected as his episcopal motto: "Serve The Lord With Gladness."

As an auxiliary bishop, Rozanski was appointed as vicar for Hispanic ministries.  He also served as the Seton vicar, supervising parishes in Anne Arundel, Howard, Carroll, Frederick, Washington, Allegany, and Garrett Counties.

The United States Conference of Catholic Bishops (USCCB) announced on April 18, 2011, that Rozanski would succeed Bishop Edward U. Kmiec, as co-chair of the Polish National Catholic-Roman Catholic dialogue. He was named to the post by Archbishop Wilton Gregory. On November 12, 2013, Rozanski was elected as chair of the USCCB Committee on Ecumenical and Interreligious Affairs.

Bishop of Springfield

On June 19, 2014, Pope Francis named Rozanski the ninth bishop of the Diocese of Springfield. He was installed on August 12, 2014.

In December 2019, Rozanski banned the Pioneer Valley Gay Men's Chorus from singing in a Christmas caroling concert at St. Theresa's of Lisieux Parish in South Hadley, Massachusetts.

In September 2018, a Diocesan Review Board notified Rozanski that it had found an allegation of sexual abuse by former Springfield Bishop Christopher Weldon to be credible. The board cited a Chicopee resident who said that Weldon had abused him a child. The board later split on the case, with several members saying that the victim did not name Weldon directly, while three others present maintained they had witnessed otherwise. In June 2019, Rozanski met with the victim, saying he found the allegations "deeply troubling". In June 2020, an investigation by retired Superior Court Judge Peter A. Velis found the victim's claim "to be unequivocally credible."

After the Velis' findings were released, Rozanski asked Trinity Health of New England to remove Weldon's name from its rehabilitation center, the former Farren Memorial Hospital in Montague, Massachusetts. Weldon's remains were disinterred and moved to more secluded spot in the cemetery. Rozanski ordered the removal of all photographs, memorials and other mentions of Weldon from all diocesan facilities, schools and churches.

In June 2020, Robert M. Hoatson, co-founder of Road to Recover Inc. for survivors of clerical sexual abuse, called on Rozanski to resign. Hoatson described Rozanski's handling of sexual abuse allegations against Weldon to be  “woefully deficient.” Hoatson also called on Pope Francis to rescind his appointment of Rozanski as archbishop of St. Louis.

Archbishop of St. Louis
On June 10, 2020, Francis appointed Rozanski as archbishop of the Archdiocese of St. Louis, following the retirement of Archbishop Robert Carlson.  Rozanski was installed on August 25, 2020 at the Cathedral Basilica of St. Louis in St. Louis, Missouri.

See also

 Catholic Church hierarchy
 Catholic Church in the United States
 Historical list of the Catholic bishops of the United States
 List of Catholic bishops of the United States
 Lists of patriarchs, archbishops, and bishops

References

External links

Roman Catholic Archdiocese of St. Louis Official Site 
 Roman Catholic Diocese of Springfield in Massachusetts
 Roman Catholic Archdiocese of Baltimore website

  

1958 births
Living people
Roman Catholic Diocese of Springfield in Massachusetts
Roman Catholic bishops of Springfield in Massachusetts
Roman Catholic Archdiocese of Baltimore
Catholic Church in Maryland
Religious leaders from Baltimore
American people of Polish descent
Catholic University of America alumni
21st-century Roman Catholic archbishops in the United States